Gordon William Labossiere (born January 2, 1940) is a Canadian former professional ice hockey player who played 215 games in the National Hockey League between 1963 and 1971 and 301 games in the World Hockey Association between 1972 and 1976.

Career statistics

Regular season and playoffs

Awards and achievements
 MJHL Scoring Champion (1958)
 MJHL Goal Leader (1958)
 MJHL First Team Allstar (1958)
 MJHL MVP (1958)
 EPHL Scoring Champion (1963)
 EPHL First All-Star Team (1963)
 AHL First All-Star Team (1967)
 John B. Sollenberger Trophy Winner (1967)
 AHL Second All-Star Team (1970)
 Avco Cup (WHA) Championships (1974 & 1975)
 Honoured Member of the Manitoba Hockey Hall of Fame

External links
 
 Gord Labossiere's biography at Manitoba Hockey Hall of Fame

1940 births
Living people
Baltimore Clippers players
Canadian ice hockey centres
Cleveland Barons (1937–1973) players
Edmonton Flyers (WHL) players
Franco-Manitoban people
Houston Aeros (WHA) players
Los Angeles Kings players
Minnesota North Stars players
New York Rangers players
People from Saint Boniface, Winnipeg
Quebec Aces (AHL) players
Saskatoon Quakers players
Ice hockey people from Winnipeg
Springfield Kings players
Sudbury Wolves (EPHL) players
Winnipeg Rangers players
Winnipeg Warriors (minor pro) players